The Fearless Tour was the first headlining concert tour by American singer-songwriter Taylor Swift, launched in support of her second studio album, Fearless (2008). Big Machine Records announced the first 52-date North American leg in January 2009, and before the tour began on April 23, 2009, in Evansville, U.S., Swift had headlined many music festivals through North America. Through 2009, Swift announced additional dates for the United Kingdom, Australia, and Japan, and the Fearless Tour concluded on July 10, 2010, in Cavendish, Canada. Kellie Pickler, Gloriana, and Justin Bieber were supporting acts.

Upon completion, the Fearless Tour drew 1.2 million in attendance and grossed $66.5 million, after having covered 118 shows through 15 months. Several shows were recorded and released for a concert series, Journey to Fearless, which aired on The Hub from October 22 to 24, 2010. Journey to Fearless was later released on DVD and Blu-ray in October 2011.

Background and development

American singer-songwriter Taylor Swift's second studio album, Fearless, was released on November 11, 2008, by Big Machine Records. Swift wrote or co-wrote all tracks, including eight written solely by herself. Fearless was a commercial success, peaking atop the Billboard 200 and sold over two million copies in the United States through 2008, making Swift the best-selling musician of the year in the country.

On January 29, 2009, Big Machine announced the Fearless Tour through Swift's official website; it was her first tour as headliner. She had opened tours for other country artists such as Rascal Flatts and Brad Paisley. According to the press release, Swift would headline many festivals—such as the Houston Livestock Show and Rodeo and the Florida Strawberry Festival—before embarking on a 52-date tour visiting North America. It was set to commence on April 23, 2009, in Evansville, Indiana, with tickets on sale from February 6 through Ticketmaster. Former American Idol contestant and country singer Kellie Pickler and country band Gloriana were announced as opening acts. The tour took place after Swift, at 19, had finished high school. Rehearsals started in Nashville, Tennessee, one week after the announcement.

The tour kicked off in Evansville, Indiana on April 23, 2009 at Roberts Municipal Stadium. In honor of the kickoff of the sold-out tour, Swift was presented the key to the city of Evansville and the City Council President declared Thursday, April 23, 2009 Taylor Swift Day.

In late June, a new tour date was announced for November 23 at the Wembley Arena in London. However it became apparent that neither Kellie Pickler nor Gloriana would be joining her on the UK part of the tour. Taylor Swift announced another date in the UK at the Manchester Evening News Arena on November 24. This was the final and second tour date in the UK. It was announced later that singer Justin Bieber would join Swift on the two UK dates. While performing at Wembley Arena, Bieber broke his foot while he performed the opening lines of "One Time", but still finished the song. Despite his injury, Bieber confirmed that he would still perform in Manchester with Swift the following day, although the Wembley concert was cut short as he could not perform the encore. Bieber then went on to perform at the Manchester performance with an encore, he sang "With You" a cover of the original version from Chris Brown. Following a 10-minute applause after she had sung "Tim McGraw", Swift told the Manchester audience "Everytime I hear the word Manchester, I won't be able to stop smiling...I love you!". According to a German magazine, Swift was supposed to play three shows in Germany. However, tickets for those concerts never went on sale.

On September 30, it was announced that Swift would return to Australia in February 2010 to play another series of concerts, but now in arenas. On October 8, it was announced that the tour would be extended through June 2, 2010 to include 37 additional shows in North America. It was confirmed that Justin Bieber would be performing at the Gillette Stadium on June 5, 2010 with Swift.

Production and stage 
Swift helped design the stage settings, including a fairy-tale castle. The tour featured a theatrical presentation of graphics, sets and visual elements all designed by Swift. The show runs nearly 90 minutes and showcases Swift playing five different guitars as well as the piano. The show featured multiple costume changes and a fairy-tale castle illuminated by more than a million lumens of light.

Concert synopsis
The show opens with the stage decorated as a school hallway. Swift appears at the top of the stage, in a band uniform, and sings "You Belong With Me". During the climax of the song, dancers remove Swift's outfit to reveal a sparkling, silver dress. "Our Song" and "Tell Me Why" are performed next, and then Swift gives a speech about her high school crush and his girlfriend. The backdrops of the stage turn into a library where Swift performs "Teardrops on My Guitar". She then sings "Fearless" and exits for a costume change.

The next segment begins with Swift, in a red dress, and a male dancer on red armchairs where she sings "Forever & Always". Swift leaves and changes into a teal gown and crosses the audience during a performance of "Hey Stephen". She goes to a B-stage where "Fifteen" and "Tim McGraw" are sung with a guitar. The act ends with Swift returning to the main stage, singing "White Horse".

The third act begins with Swift and her dancers in Renaissance attire during a performance of "Love Story", she then changes into a white gown and sings "The Way I Loved You". The next segment sees Swift, in a purple mini-dress, at a piano, which is at the top of the stage. There she performs "You're Not Sorry", with elements of Justin Timberlake's "What Goes Around...Comes Around", as her dancers, in black, perform acrobats on the bottom stage. "Picture to Burn" and "Change" are sung next, the former with fire on the backdrops, and Swift exits for a final costume change.

During the encore, she appears on top of the stage again, in a black gown, performing "I'm Only Me When I'm With You" with her supporting acts Gloriana and Kellie Pickler; however, during shows in 2010, Swift sang "Today Was a Fairytale" alone. She then gives a speech about an ex who cheated on her and sings "Should've Said No". During the performance, fake rain comes from the roof of the stage and Swift closes the show by going backstage as curtains are drawn.

Commercial performance 
The Fearless Tour covered 118 shows over 15 months in total. It grossed $66,246,496 from over 89 reported shows and an audience of 1,207,887.

Journey to Fearless
Journey to Fearless is a three-part music documentary miniseries starring American singer-songwriter Taylor Swift that originally aired on The Hub starting on October 22, 2010. The complete 135-minute special was released on Blu-ray and DVD through Shout! Factory on October 11, 2011.

Certification

Supporting acts

The tour featured three different supporting acts across three continents. Gloriana toured with Swift primarily in North America and Oceania, Kellie Pickler played on the North American leg, and Justin Bieber performed on the United Kingdom and Foxboro, Massachusetts dates. The following represents the set lists of the supporting acts.

Set list
The following is the standard 2009 set list.

"You Belong with Me"
"Our Song"
"Tell Me Why"
"Teardrops on My Guitar"
"Fearless"
"Forever & Always"
"Hey Stephen"
"Fifteen"
"Tim McGraw"
"White Horse"
"Love Story"
"The Way I Loved You"
"You're Not Sorry" (contains an excerpt from "What Goes Around...Comes Around")
"Picture to Burn"
"Change"
Encore
"I'm Only Me When I'm with You" (with Kellie Pickler and Gloriana)
"Should've Said No"

Notes
For the 2010 concerts, Swift replaced "I'm Only Me When I'm with You" with "Today Was a Fairytale".
Swift performed "The Best Day" at the show in Evansville on April 23, 2009 and the show in Moline on May 8, 2010.
During the show in Los Angeles on May 22, 2009, Swift performed "Your Body Is a Wonderland" and "White Horse" with John Mayer.
During the show in Nashville on September 12, 2009, Swift performed "The Way You Love Me" with Faith Hill.
During the show in Brisbane on February 4, 2010, Swift performed "Two Is Better Than One".
During the show in Los Angeles on April 15, 2010, Swift performed "Hot n Cold" with Katy Perry.
During the show in Foxborough on June 5, 2010, Swift performed "Jump then Fall".

Tour dates

Notes

Record sellouts
Tickets for the first shows for the Fearless Tour went on sale in early February 2009 and sold-out almost instantly. On February 6, 2009, tickets went on sale for the May 22 date at Los Angeles’ Staples Center and sold out in two minutes. Tickets for several dates and venues, including Madison Square Garden, went on sale the following week and sold out in a record of one minute. Swift is also one of the only artists to have sold out the Save Mart Center in less than ten minutes.

References

External links

2009 concert tours
2010 concert tours
Taylor Swift concert tours
Concert tours of North America
Concert tours of Europe
Concert tours of Oceania
Concert tours of Asia
Concert tours of the United States
Concert tours of the United Kingdom
Concert tours of Canada
Concert tours of Australia
Concert tours of Japan